Nada más que amor is a 1942 Chilean film starring Alberto Closas.

External links
 

1942 films
1940s Spanish-language films
Chilean black-and-white films
1940s romance films